The 2021–22 Southern Counties East Football League season was the 56th in the history of the Southern Counties East Football League, a football competition in England, and the sixth year the competition had two divisions, the Premier Division and Division One, at Steps 5 and 6 respectively in the English football league system.

The league constitution for this season was based on allocations for Steps 5 and 6 that were announced by The Football Association on 18 May 2021, and were subject to appeal. The allocations were confirmed on 19 June at the league's annual general meeting, conducted remotely.

After the abandonment of the 2019–20 and 2020–21 seasons due to the COVID-19 pandemic in England, numerous promotions were decided on a points per game basis over the previous two seasons.

Premier Division

The Premier Division comprised 17 clubs from the previous season after its competition was abandoned, along with three new clubs, all promoted from Division One:
 Holmesdale
 Kennington
 Rusthall

Premier Division table

Results table

Division One

Division One comprised the 14 teams which competed when the previous season's competition was aborted, along with six new clubs:
 Promoted from the Kent County League
 Faversham Strike Force
 Larkfield & New Hythe Wanderers
 Staplehurst Monarchs
 Transferred from the Combined Counties League
 Chessington & Hook United
 Tooting Bec
 Westside

Division One table

Play-offs

References

External links
 Southern Counties East Football League Official Website

2021-22
9